William Henry Noble (September 22, 1788 – February 5, 1850) was an American businessman and politician who served one term as a U.S. Representative from New York from 1837 to 1839.

Biography 
Born in New Milford, Connecticut, received a limited education, and became a farmer and tanner.  Noble moved to Ballston Spa, where he was an active in the Episcopal church and served as a vestryman.

Business 
He later resided in Ira, Cato, Rochester, and Auburn.  He served in local offices, including school board member and school inspector in Ira, postmaster in Cato, town supervisor of Auburn, and collector of canal tolls in Montezuma.   In addition, he was active in local businesses, including serving on the board of directors of the Cayuga County National Bank.

Militia 
He served as member of the New York State Assembly from 1828 to 1830.  He was also an officer in the New York Militia, and attained the rank of lieutenant colonel as second-in-command of the 167th Infantry Regiment, a unit of the 7th Brigade, 21st Division.

Congress 
Noble was elected as a Democrat to the Twenty-fifth Congress (March 4, 1837 – March 3, 1839).  He was an unsuccessful candidate for reelection in 1838 to the Twenty-sixth Congress.

Later career and death 
He served as inspector of Auburn Prison from 1843 to 1845.  He died in Rochester, New York on February 5, 1850.  He was buried at Cato-Meridian Cemetery in Ira.

References

External links

1788 births
1850 deaths
Democratic Party members of the New York State Assembly
Democratic Party members of the United States House of Representatives from New York (state)
19th-century American politicians